Thomas Paire (born 9 March 1985) is a French tennis player.

Paire has a career high ATP singles ranking of 1111 achieved on 26 July 2010. He also has a career high ATP doubles ranking of 840 achieved on 29 May 2017.

Paire made his ATP main draw debut at the 2017 Lyon Open in the doubles draw, partnering his younger brother Benoît. Paire and Paire defeated Purav Raja and Divij Sharan in the first round, but were then defeated by Oliver Marach and Mate Pavić.

External links

1985 births
Living people
French male tennis players